is a city in Fukushima Prefecture, Japan. , the city had an estimated population of 118,159 in 50,365 households, and a population density of 310 persons per km2.

Geography

Aizuwakamatsu is located in the western part of Fukushima Prefecture, in the southeast part of Aizu basin.

Mountains
 Mount Ōtodake (1416 m)
 Mount Seaburi
 Mount Oda
 Mount Iimori

Rivers
 Aga River
 Nippashi River
 Yugawa River
 Sesenagi River

Lakes
 Lake Inawashiro
 Lake Wakasato
 Lake Higashiyama
 Lake Sohara

Hot springs
 Higashiyama Onsen
 Ashinomaki Onsen

Administrative divisions
There are 11 administrative divisions (hamlets or ) in the city.
 Wakamatsu
 Machikita
 Kouya
 Kouzashi
 Monden
 Ikki
 Higashiyama
 Ōto
 Minato
 Kitaaizu
 Kawahigashi

Neighboring municipalities
Fukushima Prefecture
North: Kitakata, Aizubange, Yugawa, Bandai
East: Koriyama, Inawashiro
West: Aizumisato
South: Shimogo, Tenei

Climate
Aizuwakamatsu has a hot-summer Humid continental climate (Köppen Dfa) characterized by warm summers and cold winters with heavy snowfall. Although it is located in an inland valley, Aizuwakamatsu's climate resembles that of the Hokuriku region on the Sea of Japan coast. The average annual temperature in Aizuwakamatsu is 11.2 °C. The average annual rainfall is 1270 mm with September as the wettest month. The temperatures are highest on average in August, at around 24.7 °C, and lowest in January, at around -1.2 °C.

Demographics
Per Japanese census data, the population of Aizuwakamatsu peaked around the year 1990 and had since declined to pre-1960 levels.

History

The area of present-day Aizuwakamatsu was part of ancient Mutsu Province, and was settled from prehistoric times. The Aizu-Otsuka Kofun within the city borders dates from the 4th century AD, and is an Important Cultural Property.

According to legend, in 88 BCE, Emperor Sujin sent two generals; Ohiko and Takenukawa-wake to the Tōhoku region for the purpose of establishing peace after the quashing of a rebellion in the region.

Before the late 12th century, Aizuwakamatsu was mainly a market town and a base for regional warlords. Starting in 1192, Aizuwakamatsu became part of the regions that were controlled by the Kamakura shogunate. Soon after taking power, Yoritomo granted a samurai named Suwara Yoshitsura (from the Miura clan) all of Aizu. A descendant of Suwara, Ashina Morinori, began construction of the first castle in the city in 1384. During the Sengoku period the final lord of Aizu, Ashina Moritaka, died in 1583 and soon the Ashina clan lost power. After the Satake clan took control of the castle, they placed a twelve-year-old member of their clan who was renamed Ashina Morishige and proclaimed lord of Aizu. The Ashina clan regained control of Aizu for a brief time in 1589 with the help of Date Masamune. However, Masamune took over the domain for himself soon after. He surrendered in 1590 to Toyotomi Hideyoshi. Toyotomi gave Aizu to one of his allies, Gamo Ujisato who then began construction in 1592 of a new castle at the site. It was during this time that the town was renamed "Wakamatsu" (young pine).

During the Edo period, Aizu was controlled briefly by Uesugi Kagekatsu in 1600 after the death of Gamo Ujisato in 1596. Tokugawa Ieyasu accused Uesugi of gathering troops in Aizu. Ieyasu then transferred the Uesugi to Yonezawa.  Through inheritance, Aizu was passed to Hoshina Masayuki (a brother of the third Tokugawa shogun) in 1643. The Edo period saw the economic and cultural growth of Aizu.

Hoshina's descendants would rule the Aizu Domain for the next 200 years, adopting the Matsudaira name until the ninth generation Daimyō, Matsudaira Katamori, backed the bakufu in the Boshin War. Aizuwakamatsu Castle would fall during the Battle of Aizu and the domain forfeit. A group of 22, including loyal retainers and their families, managed to escape to California and lend the name of their home to establish the first Japanese colony in America, the ill fated Wakamatsu Tea and Silk Farm Colony in 1869.

After the Meiji Restoration, Wakamatsu Town was created with the establishment of the modern municipalities system on April 1, 1889. It became Wakamatsu City in 1899. On April 1, 1937, a part of Machikita village (from Kitaaizu District) was merged into the city of Wakamatsu. The remained was annexed on April 1, 1951. The name of the city was changed to Aizuwakamatsu on January 1, 1955 when Wakamatsu merged with seven villages of Kitaaizu District (Kouya, Kouzashi, Monden, Ikki, Higashiyama, Ōto and Minato). . A part of the town of Hongō (locality of Oya) (from Ōnuma District) was merged into Aizuwakamatsu on April 1, 1955.

Aizuwakamatsu further expanded by annexing  the village of Kitaaizu (from Kitaaizu District) on November 1, 2004 and the town of Kawahigashi (from Kawanuma District) on November 1, 2005.

Government

Aizuwakamatsu has a mayor-council form of government with a directly elected mayor and a unicameral city legislature of 29 members The city contributes four members to the Fukushima Prefectural Assembly. In terms of national politics, the city is part of Fukushima Electoral District 4 for the lower house of the Diet of Japan.

Economy
Aizuwakamatsu is a local commercial center. The area is traditionally noted for sake brewing and lacquerware. Modern industries include textiles, wood processing and electronics.

Education
Aizuwakamatsu has one prefectural university and a private junior college. The city has 19 public elementary school and 11 public junior high schools operated by the city government. In addition, there is one private elementary school and one private junior high school. The Fukushima Prefectural Board of Education operates five public high schools and one combined junior/senior high school. The prefecture also operates two special education schools.

Universities and colleges
University of Aizu 
Junior College of Aizu

Senior high schools

Public (prefectural)
Aizu High School (会津高等学校)
Aoi High School (葵高等学校)
Aizu Gakuhō High School (会津学鳳高等学校)
Wakamatsu Shōgyō High School (若松商業高等学校)
Aizu Kōgyō High School (若松工業高等学校)
Aizu Second High School (会津第二高等学校)

Private
Aizuwakamatsu Xaverio Gakuen High School (会津若松ザベリオ学園高等学校)
Wakamatsu 1st High School (若松第一高等学校)
Jinai High School (仁愛高等学校)

Junior high schools

Public (municipal)
Aizuwakamatsu First Junior High School (会津若松市立第一中学校)
Aizuwakamatsu Second Junior High School (会津若松市立第二中学校)
Aizuwakamatsu Third Junior High School (会津若松市立第三中学校)
Aizuwakamatsu Fourth Junior High School (会津若松市立第四中学校)
Aizuwakamatsu Fifth Junior High School (会津若松市立第五中学校)
Aizuwakamatsu Sixth Junior High School (会津若松市立第六中学校)
Ikki Junior High School (一箕中学校)
Ōto Junior High School (大戸中学校)
Minato Junior High School (湊中学校)
Kitaaizu Junior High School (北会津中学校)
Kawahigashi Junior High School (河東中学校)
Aizu Gakuhō Junior High School (会津学鳳中学校, prefectural)
Note: All junior high schools are municipal except for Aizu Gakuhō Junior High School.

Private
Aizuwakamatsu Xaverio Gakuen Junior High School (会津若松ザベリオ学園中学校)

Transportation

Railway
 JR East – Banetsu West Line
  –  –  –  
 JR East – Tadami Line
Aizu-Wakamatsu –  –  – 
 Aizu Railway – Aizu Line
Nishi-Wakamatsu – Minami-Wakamatsu – Monden – Amaya – Ashinomaki-Onsen – Ōkawa-Dam-Kōen – Ashinomaki-Onsen-Minami

Highway
  – Bandai-Kawahigashi IC – Aizu-Wakamatsu IC

Media

Television 
NHK Fukushima
Fukushima Television Broadcasting
Fukushima Central Television
Fukushima Broadcasting
TV-U Fukushima

Newspapers 
Fukushima Mimpō
Fukushima Min-Yū

Radio 
FM Aizu

Sister city relations

Japanese sister cities
 Mutsu, Aomori (Since September 23, 1984)
 Naruto, Tokushima (Since October 30, 1999)
 Ina, Nagano (Since September 24, 2000)
 Yokosuka, Kanagawa (Since April 17, 2005)

International sister cities
  – Jingzhou (Since June 15, 1991)
  – Saipan (Since September 22, 2006)

Local attractions

 Aizuwakamatsu Castle (Tsuruga-jo)
 Aizu Matsudaira's Royal Garden (Oyakuen)
Mount Iimori
Byakkotai graves
 Sazaedo
 former Takizawa Honjin
 Aizu Matsudaira clan grave
Nisshinkan
 Aizu Samurai Residences
 Nanukamachi-dori Street

Culture

Festivals
 Aizu Festival

Foods

 Kozuyu
 Sauce Katsu-don
 Basashi (horse sashimi)
 Soba
 Boutara
 Sake

Others
 Akabeko
 Okiagari-koboshi

Notable people from Aizuwakamatsu
 Sōichirō Hoshi, voice actor
 Hiroshi Sasagawa, anime creator

References

External links

Official Website 

 
Cities in Fukushima Prefecture